Victoria No. 203: Diamonds Are Forever is a 2007 bollywood heist comedy thriller movie and a remake of the 1972 film, named Victoria No.203. The film was directed by Anant Mahadevan and produced by Kamal Sadanah,son of Brij Sadanah who produced and directed of the original. Kamal Sadanah was cast in a supporting role as a villain in the film. This film also starred Om Puri, Anupam Kher, Jimmy Shergill, Preeti Jhangiani, Javed Jaffrey, Johnny Lever and marked the debut of a newcomer actress Soniya Mehra, daughter of a bollywood actor Vinod Mehra. The film was released on 31 August 2007.

Cast

 Anupam Kher as Raja
 Om Puri as Rana
 Jimmy Sheirgill as Jimmy Joseph
 Soniya Mehra as Sara
 Preeti Jhangiani as Devyani / Mona
 Kamal Sadanah as Ranjeet
 Javed Jaffrey as Bobby 'BB' Bombatta
 Johnny Lever as Ghanshyam Dhanwani
 Aditi Govitrikar as Babyji
 Tora Khasgir

Story
The movie is about the heist of some of the world's rarest and exquisite diamonds which are worth more than 3 billion. Bobby Bombata (Javed Jaffrey) a huge industrialist and his girlfriend Devyani (Preeti Jhangiani) plan the theft of these diamonds along with Ranjit (Kamal Sadanah) a cold-blooded assassin. They hire Tora (Tora Khasgir), an expert dacoit to carry out the action. Tora double-crosses Bobby with the help of her brother Karan (Rajesh Khera), but in the process gets killed. But she hides the diamond in a carriage, Victoria No.203. Raman, the driver of the carriage Victoria No. 203 is unaware of this and offers to help her, but the police level charges of murder and put him behind bars. A diamond expert Jimmy (Jimmy Sheirgill) and two small-time-but-quite-old crooks Raja (Anupam Kher) and Rana (Om Puri) are also behind the diamonds. Raman's daughter Sara (Sonia Vinod Mehra) takes up the responsibility of freeing her father. Who gets the possession of the diamond forms the rest of the story.

Music
Music is composed by Viju Shah and lyrics are penned by Varma Malik, Indeevar, Asif Ali Beg and Chandrashekhar Rajit.
Audio On: Saregama-HMV  
Number of Songs: 6
Album Released on: 16 May 2007

 Victoria 203: Dominique Cerejo
 Do bechare: Amit Kumar & Udit Narayan
 Deedani: Shaan & Shreya Ghoshal
 Thoda sa tehro: Shreya Ghoshal
 Zindagi aa gayi: Zubeen Garg
 Victoria 203: Annika

External links
Victoria No. 203 at Indiafm
Victoria No. 203 Movie Review
 

2007 films
2000s Hindi-language films
Remakes of Indian films
Films scored by Viju Shah
Films directed by Anant Mahadevan
Indian heist films
Indian crime comedy films
Indian comedy thriller films